Endoclita auratus is a species of moth of the family Hepialidae. It is known from Myanmar. The food plants for this species are Alnus, Cryptomeria, and Eucalyptus.

References

External links
Hepialidae genera

Moths described in 1893
Hepialidae